Jean Patrick Lima dos Reis (born 14 May 1997), known as Jean Patric, is a Brazilian footballer who plays as a winger or a forward for J1 League club Vissel Kobe.

Career

Septemvri Sofia
On 4 August 2017 Jean Patric joined Levski Sofia on trials. Later Nikolay Mitov was released and Jean Patric wasn't approved by the new manager since he wanted more experienced players.  Nikolay Mitov took Septemvri Sofia and on 2 September Patric played in a friendly match for the team against Lokomotiv Sofia and scored 2 goals. On 10 September he officially signed with Sentemvri for 2 years. He made his official debut for the team on 15 September 2017 in a league match against Levski Sofia. On 11 January 2018 he was released from the club on mutual agreement.

Career statistics

Club
.

References

External links
 
 Profile at Cerezo Osaka

1997 births
Living people
Sportspeople from Bahia
Brazilian footballers
Association football midfielders
São Paulo FC players
América Futebol Clube (RN) players
Volta Redonda FC players
FC Septemvri Sofia players
CSF Bălți players
Académico de Viseu F.C. players
C.D. Santa Clara players
First Professional Football League (Bulgaria) players
Moldovan Super Liga players
Primeira Liga players
Liga Portugal 2 players
Campeonato Brasileiro Série D players
Campeonato Brasileiro Série C players
J1 League players
Cerezo Osaka players
Vissel Kobe players
Brazilian expatriate sportspeople in Bulgaria
Expatriate footballers in Bulgaria
Brazilian expatriate sportspeople in Moldova
Expatriate footballers in Moldova
Brazilian expatriate sportspeople in Portugal
Expatriate footballers in Portugal
Brazilian expatriate sportspeople in Japan
Expatriate footballers in Japan